Hail to England is the third studio album by American heavy metal band Manowar, released in 1984 on Music for Nations.

Recording and reception 
The album title is a tribute to the country that the American band members met and formed the band in, and in particular the predominantly British NWOBHM that had emerged in the early 1980s. However, the album's cover actually features the flag of the United Kingdom, and not the flag of England.

The album was reported to have been recorded in its entirety in only six days. The album peaked at No. 83 on the UK album charts. In 2017, Rolling Stone ranked Hail to England as 87th on their list of 'The 100 Greatest Metal Albums of All Time' and Loudwire ranked it as the 17th best power metal album of all time. In 2019, Metal Hammer ranked it as the 4th best power metal album of all time.

A remixed & remastered 'Imperial Edition' of the album was released in 2019, with the band stating that the revised version would add 'the depth, the power and the clarity that could not be present in the original mixes and masters' .

Track listing 

 Alternate cassette version from the 1980s distributed through the band's mail order fan club was mislabeled, inverting the sides.

Cover versions 
 "Blood of My Enemies" was covered by Swedish death metal band Edge of Sanity, on their album The Spectral Sorrows.
 "Blood of My Enemies" was covered by Italian power metal band Power Symphony, on their EP Futurepast.
 "Blood of My Enemies" was covered by Russian pagan metal band Рарогъ (Rarog), on their album "Сыны Сокола" ("Sons of a Falcon"), under the name of "Кровь Наших Врагов" ("Blood of Our Enemies")
 "Blood of My Enemies" was covered by heavy metal band Ross the Boss, one of the former members of Manowar in 2017
 "Kill with Power" was covered by Swedish melodic death metal band Arch Enemy, on their EP Dead Eyes See No Future, and is often covered live by Brazilian parody metal band Massacration.
 "Kill with Power" was also covered by Finnish black/heavy metal band Barathrum, on their single Black Flames and Blood. 
 "Each Dawn I Die" was covered by the Greek black metal band Necromantia on their 1997 EP Ancient Pride which was re-released with new artwork and two bonus tracks in 2006 by Black Lotus Records.

Personnel

Manowar
Eric Adams – vocals
Ross the Boss – guitars, keyboards
Joey DeMaio – bass, bass pedals
Scott Columbus – drums, percussion

Additional personal
St. Mary's Cathedral Choir – choir, vocals on "Hail to England"
David Corell – choirmaster on "Hail to England"

Production
Jack Richardson – producer
Robin Brouwers – engineer
Joe Primeau, Armand John Petri – assistant engineers
Joe Brescio – mastering
Ken Landgraf – Illustrations
Lucifer Burns, Armand "The Arm" Biondi, Anthony "Chio" Chiofalo – technicians
Jay Bergen – management, representation
J.A.R. Productions – A&R

Charts

References 

1984 albums
Manowar albums
Music for Nations albums
Albums produced by Jack Richardson (record producer)